
T87 or Type 87 may refer to:

Military

20th century
 Type 87 Chi-I, Japanese experimental medium tank of the 1920s
 Type 87 armored car, Japanese version of the Vickers Crossley Armoured Car
 Type 87 Vixen II, variant of the Vickers Vixen biplane of the 1920s
 German Type U 87 submarine of WWII

20th and 21st century
 Type 87 Self-Propelled Anti-Aircraft Gun, Japanese air defense vehicle
 Type 87 ARV, Japanese armored reconnaissance vehicle
 Type 87 grenade launcher, Chinese infantry weapon
 Type 87 Chu-MAT, Japanese anti-tank missile
 Type 87 assault rifle, a variant of the Chinese Type 81
 Type 87 anti-aircraft gun, a 25mm Chinese copy of the Soviet ZU-23-2
 Type 87 (uniform), the uniform used by People's Liberation Army during 1987 to 2007

Other uses
 Honeywell T87 ("The Round"), a thermostat
 Tatra 87, an automobile by Czech builder Tatra